Hugolino Cerasuola Stacey (4 April 1932 – 24 May 2019) was an Ecuadorian Roman Catholic bishop.

Cerasuolo Stacey was born in Ecuador and was ordained to the priesthood in 1954. 

He served as prefect apostolic of Galápagos, Ecuador, from 1967 to 1975. 

In 1975, he was ordained a bishop and served as titular bishop of Valeria and as auxiliary bishop of the Roman Catholic Archdiocese of Guayaquil, Ecuador from 1975 to 1985. 

He then served as bishop of the Roman Catholic Diocese of Loja, Ecuador, from 1985 to 2007.

Notes

1932 births
2019 deaths
21st-century Roman Catholic bishops in Ecuador
20th-century Roman Catholic bishops in Ecuador
Roman Catholic bishops of Loja